Sentinel Waggon Works Ltd was a British company based in Shrewsbury, Shropshire that made steam-powered lorries (steam wagons), railway locomotives, and later, diesel engined lorries, buses and locomotives.

History

Alley & MacLellan, Sentinel Works, Jessie Street Glasgow

Alley & MacLellan was founded in 1875 and was based in Polmadie, Glasgow. This company continued in operation until the 1950s. Initially manufacturing valves and compressors for steam engines, and later whole steamships, Alley & MacLellan acquired Simpson and Bibby of Horsehay, Shropshire, manufacturer of steam-powered road vehicles, in 1903. They began producing steam road vehicles in 1905 and in 1906 introduced a five-ton vertical-boiler steam wagon, which featured a two-cylinder undertype engine and chain drive.

Around 1915, Alley & McLellan moved the steam wagon production to a new factory to Shrewsbury and it continued under a separate company (see below), and in 1918 the company also opened a third factory in Worcester specialising in valve manufacture. Both factory buildings were prefabricated in Glasgow for local assembly and in both cases core Scottish employees transferred to the new sites.

Alley & MacLellan continued to operate in the original Sentinel Works in Jessie Street, Glasgow until the 1950s. They produced a wide range of engineering products including compressors, valves, etc. The 'Sentinel' name continued to be used for the products of the original Glasgow works until the mid 20th Century.

Move to Shrewsbury

The company Sentinel Waggon Works Ltd was formed when steam wagon production was switched to a new factory, opened at Shrewsbury in 1915. There were several other slight changes to the name over the company's lifetime when further infusions of working capital were required to obviate financial problems.

Alley & MacLellan's early steam wagon was so successful that it remained in production with relatively few updates until the launch of Sentinel's famous Super in 1923. The company also produced steam railway locomotives and railcars, for railway companies and industrial customers.

In 1917, the company was bought by William Beardmore and Company.

Sentinel Waggon Works (1920) Ltd

In 1920, after financial problems, the company was reorganised as Sentinel Waggon Works (1920) Ltd. The Sentinel 'Super' model that followed in 1923 was assembled in a radical new plant at Shrewsbury, with a flow line based on Henry Ford's Model T factory at Highland Park, Michigan, with 1,550 vehicles produced.

Sentinel, along with Foden, dominated the steam market, but the 1930s saw the demise of both companies' ranges as new legislation forced the development of lighter lorries, Sentinel surviving the longest.

In 1934, Sentinel launched a new and advanced steamer – the S type which had a single-acting four-cylinder underfloor engine with longitudinal crankshaft and an overhead worm-drive axle. Their Sentinel Waggon Works' design of 1935 led to the production of 3,750 Sentinel 'Standards' in the seventeen years that followed, the biggest selling steam lorry ever. It was lighter and featured a modernised driver's cab with a set-back boiler and was available in four, six and eight-wheel form, designated S4, S6 and S8. In spite of its sophisticated design, however, it could not compete with contemporary diesel trucks for all-round convenience and payload capacity, and was phased out in the late 1930s. It was not the end of Sentinel's involvement with steam, however; the company built about 100 "S" type vehicles for export to Argentina as late as 1950, for use by the Río Turbio coal mine. It has been stated that Sentinel were never paid for the last batch of the Río Turbio production run. At least two of the Río Turbio steam wagons survive in Argentina to this day.

In 1946, Thomas Hill's signed an agency agreement with Sentinel for repair and maintenance of diesel vehicles. In 1947 Sentinel offered to extend the agreement for diesel vehicles to include the steam locomotives and an agency was accepted by Thomas Hill for sales and servicing.

Sentinel (Shrewsbury) Ltd

In 1947, the company became Sentinel (Shrewsbury) Ltd, and had developed a new range of diesel lorries. Despite Sentinel's superbly engineered vehicles, sales diminished throughout the 1950s, and by 1956 the company was forced to cease lorry production. The factory was acquired by Rolls-Royce for diesel engine production, and the remaining stock of parts and vehicles was taken over by Sentinel's chief dealer, North Cheshire Motors of Warrington, who formed a new company, Transport Vehicles (Warrington) Ltd, in 1957 to produce Sentinel-based designs under the TVW name.

In 1963, Thomas Hill's decided to renew the loco agreement and relinquish the diesel vehicle agency, concentrating all efforts on the steam locomotive work.

Rolls-Royce agree to build diesel locomotives

Despite the various interesting developments, Rolls-Royce did not consider railway locomotives to be part of their core business. They had agreed to complete all steam locos on order, and four steam receiver locos ordered by Dorman Long in 1956, but only after much consideration did Rolls-Royce finally agree at the end of 1957 to design and build a diesel locomotive of similar weight and power to the  steam loco that had sold so well. Thomas Hill's would assist in the design and development of these diesel machines and would be the sole distributor.

Last steam locomotives
In 1958, the last two Sentinel steam locomotives were delivered, marking the end of an era. Two of the newly developed steam receiver locos were delivered and proved very satisfactory in service, but Dorman Long were not happy. There had been a change of heart among their engineers as well as a change of circumstances, and they were now favouring diesel locomotives.  The last two steam receiver locos were built but never delivered and ultimately all four were converted to diesel hydraulic.

Diesel production commences
The prototype Sentinel diesel locomotive was built and ready to commence trials on the former Shropshire and Montgomeryshire Railway (then under military control) early in 1959. It met with the approval and enthusiasm of the Company's prospective customers and before the end of the year 17 locomotives had been sold and delivered. The company was ready to produce a maximum of four locomotives a month.

Between 1963 and 1966, a fleet of these diesel locomotives, eventually numbering five 0-6-0s and eighteen 0-4-0s, was supplied to the Manchester Ship Canal Company for use on the navigation's private railway network.

These Sentinels demonstrated their suitability for heavy work, but heavier and more powerful locos were called for, particularly by the steel industry, and before the end of 1963 a 74ton 0-8-0 powered by paired C8SFL engines and a 40-ton 0-4-0 fitted with a C8SFL engine had been added to the range.

Sentinel Steelman

A shaft drive  0-6-0 machine was now being developed at Shrewsbury using the new DV8T engine. Considerable interest in this loco was expressed by Stewart and Lloyds mineral division at Corby who were operating more than 20 steam locos, mainly of the Austerity type. This new locomotive Steelman was eventually delivered to Corby in late 1967, about two years overdue. The prototype locomotive proved satisfactory and three more were ordered by Stewart and Lloyds and one by Richard Thomas and Baldwins, Scunthorpe. Stewart and Lloyds' programme to replace more than 20 steam locos over the next few years the future for Steelman looked good.

British Railways offered Stewart and Lloyds 26 second-hand Swindon-built Class 14 diesel hydraulic locomotives. The rod-coupled Class 14 were powered by a  Paxman engine with Voith Transmission and were capable of doing the work required at a fraction of the price of new Steelman locomotives. No further "Steelman" locos were built at Shrewsbury.

In 1979, ICI Billingham wanted two heavy locomotives to replace their ageing Yorkshire Janus locomotives. Their engineers visited many industrial sites, and steelworks in particular, to evaluate available locomotives. Their requirements were discussed with various UK locomotive manufacturers, and they ordered an updated version of the Sentinel Steelman design. Two machines were delivered toward the end of 1981.

UK sales of Sentinel locos were now fewer than 10 per year, their only overseas success had been to license the assembly of 36 0-6-0 locomotives by Sorefame for the Portuguese Railways in 1965/66. These locomotives became the CP Class 1150.

Road vehicles

Steam wagons
 Alley & MacLellan five-ton steam wagon (1906) – now commonly referred to as the "Standard" Sentinel
 Super Sentinel (1923)
 Sentinel DG4 (1928)
 Sentinel DG6 (1927)
 Sentinel DG8 (1929) – world's first four-axle, twin steer truck
 Sentinel S4 (1933)
 Sentinel S6 (1933)
 Sentinel S8 (1933)

Diesel lorries 
 Sentinel HSG (1938)
 Sentinel DV44 (1947)
 Sentinel DV46 (1949)
 Sentinel DV66 (1950)
 Sentinel aircraft tug

Diesel buses 
 Sentinel 32-seat bus (1924)
 Sentinel HSG (1935)
 Sentinel SLC4-40 (1948)
 Sentinel STC6-44 (1950)
 Sentinel SL chassis (1951)

Railway vehicles

The locomotives and railcars (with a few exceptions) used the standard steam lorry boilers and engine units.

CE Class
Centre Engine

BE Class
Balanced Engine
 LMS Sentinel 7164

DE Class
Double Engine

100 hp steam locomotives

 Works no. 6515/1926, Isham Quarries, Northamptonshire, (ex-GWR No. 12)
 Works no. 6520/1926, "Toby" 0-4-0VG; Port of Par, Cornwall. (Replaced 1876 Manning Wardle 0-4-0ST "Punch". Replaced by Bagnall 0-4-0ST "Alfred" and "Judy").
 Works no. 6807/1928, "Gervase"; rebuilt as a vertical-boilered geared locomotive from 1900 Manning Wardle. (Moved to Kent & East Sussex Railway in 1972, and to the Elsecar Heritage Railway in 2008.)
 Works no. 7026/1928, British Quarrying Co., Criggion, Montgomeryshire
 Works no. 7299/1928, Corby Quarries, Rockingham Forest, (ex-Phoenix Tube Works)
 Works no. 9365/1945, "Belvedere"; Isham Quarries, Northamptonshire, (ex-Thomas Hill, Rotherham): preserved at Northamptonshire Ironstone Railway Trust
 Works no. 9369/1946, "Musketeer"; Isham Quarries, Northamptonshire, (ex-Williams & Williams, Hooton): preserved at Northamptonshire Ironstone Railway Trust
 Works no. 9615/1956, Oxfordshire Ironstone Quarries, Banbury
 LMS Sentinels 7160-3
 LNER Class Y1
 LNER Class Y3

200 hp steam locomotives

 LNER Class Y10
 S&DJR Sentinels
 Works no. 7109/1927, Croydon Gasworks No. 37 "Joyce", preserved at Midsomer Norton railway station

Railcars

 In 1925, the New Zealand Railways Department bought one Sentinel-Cammell steam railcar which became part of its RM class.
 Between 1925 and 1932, the London and North Eastern Railway bought 80 Sentinel steam railcars and four were supplied to the LNER-controlled Cheshire Lines Committee.
 In 1928, Palestine Railways bought two Sentinel-Cammell articulated steam railcars for local services. Each unit had two cars articulated over three bogies. Palestine Railways found the railcar format inflexible, as if passenger numbers exceeded the capacity of a train it was not practical to couple up an extra coach. In 1945 PR removed the Sentinel engines and converted the railcars to ordinary coaching stock.
 In 1931, the Tasmanian Government Railways received two 61 ft 5 in single engine Sentinel-Cammell railcars which became known as the SP Class. In 1934 two more 68 ft 2 in cars were received, and owing to higher maintenance requirements, in 1937 five more cars were received with twin-engine oil-firing boilers. In the 1950s as more diesel railcars were introduced, the boilers and engines were removed and they continued as passenger stock.
 In 1933, the Southern Railway bought a Sentinel-Cammell steam railcar for use on the Devil's Dyke branch, in East Sussex. Although operationally successful, the single railcar was not large enough to meet the needs of this line. It was transferred away from the line in March 1936 and tried in other areas, but was withdrawn in 1940.

 In 1935, the Ferrocarril Central del Paraguay (Paraguay Central Railway) acquired three oil-fired railcars with trailers for the suburban service between Asunción and Ypacarai.
 In 1951, Egyptian National Railways bought 10 articulated steam railcars. Each had three carriage bodies articulated over four bogies. One is preserved by the Quainton Railway Society at the Buckinghamshire Railway Centre, England.

Specials

The Doble Shunter
 LMS Sentinel 7192 – so-called as it was fitted with an Abner Doble boiler

The Double Locomotive
A special locomotive was produced at Sentinel, for Dorman Long and named "Princess". It consisted of 2 x 0-6-0 chassis coupled together to articulate. One unit carried the cab, a 5 drum oil-fired Woolnough boiler and two  engines. It was considered a magnificent machine by the staff but unfortunately was the only one of its kind ever built.

The Gyro locomotive 
Another special was the NCB Gyro or Electrogyro Locomotive. Based on a  4-wheeled 0-4-0 frame fitted with two "gyro units" (see Flywheel energy storage) made by Maschinenfabrik Oerlikon of Switzerland. The gyros were principally a 3ton horizontal flywheel enclosed in a vessel filled with low pressure hydrogen. A vertically mounted three-phase squirrel-cage electric motor/generator was directly coupled to each flywheel shaft. The motor took its power from a side-mounted supply at static posts via a four-contact swinging arm extended or retracted pneumatically by the driver. Power could only be taken whilst the loco was stationary alongside one of these posts. When the gyros had reached the required speed, the driver would retract the contact arm, switch the motor to generation and controlled the locomotive in a similar way to a diesel-electric loco. Charging posts had to be strategically placed around the site. A contact arm was provided on each side of the locomotive, although it is not clear if posts were installed on one or both sides of the track. Each gyro operated between 3,000rpm when fully 'charged;' and 1,800rpm before recharging. Recharging took 2minutes and the locomotive could work for around 30 minutes before recharging.

This machine was specially built for the National Coal Board (NCB) at Seaton Delaval. The intention was to investigate the use of gyroscopic storage as a potential method for a flameproof and emissions-free underground locomotive. It operated from 1958, very satisfactorily, but was eventually taken out of service because of site development and its restricted field of operation. In April 1965 it was converted for the NCB to a diesel hydraulic machine.

The Receiver Locomotives
The Receiver Locomotives were another special type built just for Dorman Long and were based on the idea of a Fireless locomotive.

Steam locomotives used by UK mainline companies
 LNER Class Y1
 LNER Class Y3
 LNER Class Y10
 S&DJR Sentinels
 LMS Sentinels 7160-3
 LMS Sentinel 7164
 LMS Sentinel 7192

Preservation

Road vehicles
A number of Sentinel steam wagons and tractors exist in preservation in the UK—about 117 as of 2008. They are often shown at steam fairs in the UK. For more information see the Sentinel Drivers Club website. A number also exist in Australia and other countries.

Railway locomotives

United Kingdom
There are several surviving steam locomotives located at various heritage railways around the UK, including: the Elsecar Heritage Railway, the Middleton Railway, the Foxfield Light Railway and the Chasewater Railway.

South America
Three Sentinel steam locos were used at Amsted Maxion's railway equipment plant in Cruzeiro, SP (Brazil). All three were 0-4-0T locomotives built in 1931 to  gauge. Two of them worked until 2014. They were the last commercially operating steam locomotives in Brazil until then. After they were shut down, they were bought by ABPF (Associação Brasileira de Preservação Ferroviária) after a long negotiation that took more than one year. Now they are preserved at ABPF shops in Cruzeiro, near Amsted Maxion's plant: 
 Sentinel #8398 – ex SPR No. 166 and EFSJ #166; kept its numbering after 1960 at FNV and continues as No. 166.
 Sentinel #8399 – ex SPR No. 167 and EFSJ #167; kept its numbering after 1960 at FNV and continues as No. 167.
 Sentinel #8400 – ex SPR No. 168 and EFSJ #168; kept its numbering after 1960 at FNV and at Amsted Maxion. After an unsuccessful attempt to convert it to diesel power, it was withdrawn and was scrapped at the plant's facilities.

See also 
 Sentinel boiler
 Steam motor
 Thomas Hill (Rotherham) Ltd
 Geared steam locomotive
 Rolls-Royce Limited

References

Sources 
 Ian Allan ABC of British Railways Locomotives, 1948 edition

Bibliography

External links

 Existing steam locomotives built by Sentinel
 British Trucks: Sentinel
 A Czech site about Skoda-Sentinels
 LNER Encyclopedia: LNER Y1 and Y3 Sentinel Shunters
 LNER Encyclopedia: The Sentinel Steam Railcars
 History of Sentinel Waggon Works (BRC)
 Archive photos of Sentinel steam waggons, diesel lorries, buses and coaches

 
Steam wagon manufacturers
Steam road vehicle manufacturers
Locomotive manufacturers of the United Kingdom
Defunct manufacturing companies of England
Defunct truck manufacturers of the United Kingdom
S

Companies based in Shropshire
History of Shropshire
Defunct motor vehicle manufacturers of England
1906 establishments in England
1956 disestablishments in England
British companies disestablished in 1956
British companies established in 1906